Chris Driver (born 10 July 1981) is an Australian-Mauritian footballer who plays as a central midfielder for Langwarrin SC in the Victorian State League Division 2.

References

External links
 
 Lemauricien Article

1981 births
Living people
Australian people of Mauritian descent
Mauritian footballers
Mauritius international footballers
Mauritian expatriate footballers
Association football midfielders
People from Narre Warren
Soccer players from Melbourne